The 1985–86 Houston Rockets season saw the Rockets lose the 1986 NBA Finals to the Larry Bird-led Boston Celtics in six games.

In the playoffs, the Rockets swept the Sacramento Kings in three games in the First Round, then defeated the Denver Nuggets in six games in the Semifinals, before dethroning the defending NBA champion Los Angeles Lakers in five games in the Conference Finals after Ralph Sampson hit a 20-foot jumper as time expired in game five at The Forum to reach the NBA Finals.

In the NBA Finals, the Rockets faced off against the heavily favored Boston Celtics in a rematch of the 1981 NBA Finals, where the Celtics won in six games. Just like in their previous NBA Finals meeting, the Rockets would lose in six games against the Celtics.

Draft picks

Roster

Regular season

Season standings

Record vs. opponents

Game log

Regular season

|- align="center" bgcolor="#ccffcc"
| 1
| October 25, 1985
| @ Utah
| W 112–108
|
|
|
| Salt Palace Acord Arena
| 1–0
|- align="center" bgcolor="#ffcccc"
| 2
| October 26, 1985
| @ L.A. Clippers
| L 129–130 (2OT)
|
|
|
| Los Angeles Memorial Sports Arena
| 1–1
|- align="center" bgcolor="#ccffcc"
| 3
| October 29, 1985
| Seattle
| W 111–99
|
|
|
| The Summit
| 2–1
|- align="center" bgcolor="#ffcccc"
| 4
| October 31, 1985
| @ Sacramento
| L 116–122
|
|
|
| ARCO Arena
| 2–2

|- align="center" bgcolor="#ccffcc"
| 5
| November 2, 1985
| San Antonio
| W 111–98
|
|
|
| The Summit
| 3–2
|- align="center" bgcolor="#ccffcc"
| 6
| November 5, 1985
| Portland
| W 127–113
|
|
|
| The Summit
| 4–2
|- align="center" bgcolor="#ccffcc"
| 7
| November 7, 1985
| L.A. Clippers
| W 137–115
|
|
|
| The Summit
| 5–2
|- align="center" bgcolor="#ccffcc"
| 8
| November 9, 1985
| @ Dallas
| W 115–110
|
|
|
| Reunion Arena
| 6–2
|- align="center" bgcolor="#ccffcc"
| 9
| November 12, 1985
| Denver
| W 127–119
|
|
|
| The Summit
| 7–2
|- align="center" bgcolor="#ccffcc"
| 10
| November 14, 1985
| New Jersey
| W 112–107
|
|
|
| The Summit
| 8–2
|- align="center" bgcolor="#ccffcc"
| 11
| November 16, 1985
| Dallas
| W 122–117
|
|
|
| The Summit
| 9–2
|- align="center" bgcolor="#ffcccc"
| 12
| November 19, 1985
| @ Denver
| L 113–127
|
|
|
| McNichols Sports Arena
| 9–3
|- align="center" bgcolor="#ccffcc"
| 13
| November 20, 1985
| Indiana
| W 126–97
|
|
|
| The Summit
| 10–3
|- align="center" bgcolor="#ffcccc"
| 14
| November 22, 1985
| @ Seattle
| L 103–122
|
|
|
| Seattle Center Coliseum
| 10–4
|- align="center" bgcolor="#ffcccc"
| 15
| November 24, 1985
| @ Portland
| L 118–125
|
|
|
| Memorial Coliseum
| 10–5
|- align="center" bgcolor="#ccffcc"
| 16
| November 26, 1985
| Golden State
| W 130–108
|
|
|
| The Summit
| 11–5
|- align="center" bgcolor="#ccffcc"
| 17
| November 27, 1985
| @ L.A. Clippers
| W 137–130 (OT)
|
|
|
| Los Angeles Memorial Sports Arena
| 12–5
|- align="center" bgcolor="#ffcccc"
| 18
| November 29, 1985
| @ Phoenix
| L 110–126
|
|
|
| Arizona Veterans Memorial Coliseum
| 12–6
|- align="center" bgcolor="#ccffcc"
| 19
| November 30, 1985
| Sacramento
| W 131–114
|
|
|
| The Summit
| 13–6

|- align="center" bgcolor="#ccffcc"
| 20
| December 3, 1985
| Phoenix
| W 118–112
|
|
|
| The Summit
| 14–6
|- align="center" bgcolor="#ffcccc"
| 21
| December 6, 1985
| @ L.A. Lakers
| L 112–120
|
|
|
| The Forum
| 14–7
|- align="center" bgcolor="#ccffcc"
| 22
| December 7, 1985
| Chicago
| W 116–104
|
|
|
| The Summit
| 15–7
|- align="center" bgcolor="#ccffcc"
| 23
| December 10, 1985
| Utah
| W 134–105
|
|
|
| The Summit
| 16–7
|- align="center" bgcolor="#ccffcc"
| 24
| December 12, 1985
| Dallas
| W 123–110
|
|
|
| The Summit
| 17–7
|- align="center" bgcolor="#ffcccc"
| 25
| December 14, 1985
| @ Utah
| L 100–114
|
|
|
| Salt Palace Acord Arena
| 17–8
|- align="center" bgcolor="#ccffcc"
| 26
| December 17, 1985
| @ Cleveland
| W 98–94
|
|
|
| Richfield Coliseum
| 18–8
|- align="center" bgcolor="#ffcccc"
| 27
| December 18, 1985
| @ Philadelphia
| L 108–126
|
|
|
| The Spectrum
| 18–9
|- align="center" bgcolor="#ffcccc"
| 28
| December 20, 1985
| @ New Jersey
| L 112–122
|
|
|
| Brendan Byrne Arena
| 18–10
|- align="center" bgcolor="#ffcccc"
| 29
| December 21, 19856:30p.m. CST
| @ Atlanta
| L 122–123
| Lloyd (34)
| Sampson (15)
| Lucas (11)
| The Omni8,563
| 18–11
|- align="center" bgcolor="#ccffcc"
| 30
| December 26, 1985
| Utah
| W 106–99
|
|
|
| The Summit
| 19–11
|- align="center" bgcolor="#ccffcc"
| 31
| December 28, 1985
| Portland
| W 118–108
|
|
|
| The Summit
| 20–11
|- align="center" bgcolor="#ffcccc"
| 32
| December 30, 1985
| @ Denver
| L 122–125
|
|
|
| McNichols Sports Arena
| 20–12

|- align="center" bgcolor="#ccffcc"
| 33
| January 2, 1986
| @ Golden State
| W 120–115
|
|
|
| Oakland-Alameda County Coliseum Arena
| 21–12
|- align="center" bgcolor="#ccffcc"
| 34
| January 4, 1986
| Philadelphia
| W 115–100
|
|
|
| The Summit
| 22–12
|- align="center" bgcolor="#ccffcc"
| 35
| January 7, 1986
| Golden State
| W 124–115
|
|
|
| The Summit
| 23–12
|- align="center" bgcolor="#ccffcc"
| 36
| January 9, 1986
| San Antonio
| W 120–110
|
|
|
| The Summit
| 24–12
|- align="center" bgcolor="#ccffcc"
| 37
| January 11, 1986
| Washington
| W 87–86
|
|
|
| The Summit
| 25–12
|- align="center" bgcolor="#ffcccc"
| 38
| January 14, 1986
| Utah
| L 102–105
|
|
|
| The Summit
| 25–13
|- align="center" bgcolor="#ccffcc"
| 39
| January 15, 1986
| @ San Antonio
| W 119–113
|
|
|
| HemisFair Arena
| 26–13
|- align="center" bgcolor="#ccffcc"
| 40
| January 18, 1986
| New York
| W 104–95
|
|
|
| The Summit
| 27–13
|- align="center" bgcolor="#ffcccc"
| 41
| January 19, 1986
| @ Dallas
| L 96–131
|
|
|
| Reunion Arena
| 27–14
|- align="center" bgcolor="#ccffcc"
| 42
| January 21, 1986
| @ Seattle
| W 100–96
|
|
|
| Seattle Center Coliseum
| 28–14
|- align="center" bgcolor="#ccffcc"
| 43
| January 23, 1986
| Sacramento
| W 124–107
|
|
|
| The Summit
| 29–14
|- align="center" bgcolor="#ccffcc"
| 44
| January 25, 1986
| Detroit
| W 117–112
|
|
|
| The Summit
| 30–14
|- align="center" bgcolor="#ccffcc"
| 45
| January 28, 1986
| Cleveland
| W 116–109
|
|
|
| The Summit
| 31–14
|- align="center" bgcolor="#ccffcc"
| 46
| January 30, 1986
| @ Sacramento
| W 111–109
|
|
|
| ARCO Arena
| 32–14

|- align="center" bgcolor="#ffcccc"
| 47
| February 1, 1986
| @ Chicago
| L 122–132
|
|
|
| Chicago Stadium
| 32–15
|- align="center" bgcolor="#ccffcc"
| 48
| February 3, 1986
| Denver
| W 104–102
|
|
|
| The Summit
| 33–15
|- align="center" bgcolor="#ffcccc"
| 49
| February 6, 1986
| L.A. Lakers
| L 95–117
|
|
|
| The Summit
| 33–16
|- align="center"
|colspan="9" bgcolor="#bbcaff"|All-Star Break
|- style="background:#cfc;"
|- bgcolor="#bbffbb"
|- align="center" bgcolor="#ccffcc"
| 50
| February 11, 19867:30p.m. CST
| Atlanta
| W 113–100
| Sampson (27)
| McCray (14)
| Lucas (16)
| The Summit16,016
| 34–16
|- align="center" bgcolor="#ffcccc"
| 51
| February 13, 1986
| @ San Antonio
| L 115–119
|
|
|
| HemisFair Arena
| 34–17
|- align="center" bgcolor="#ffcccc"
| 52
| February 15, 1986
| @ L.A. Clippers
| L 101–108
|
|
|
| Los Angeles Memorial Sports Arena
| 34–18
|- align="center" bgcolor="#ccffcc"
| 53
| February 17, 1986
| @ Golden State
| W 116–110
|
|
|
| Oakland-Alameda County Coliseum Arena
| 35–18
|- align="center" bgcolor="#ffcccc"
| 54
| February 18, 1986
| @ Sacramento
| L 105–115
|
|
|
| ARCO Arena
| 35–19
|- align="center" bgcolor="#ffcccc"
| 55
| February 20, 1986
| Milwaukee
| L 113–120
|
|
|
| The Summit
| 35–20
|- align="center" bgcolor="#ccffcc"
| 56
| February 21, 1986
| @ Dallas
| W 111–104
|
|
|
| Reunion Arena
| 36–20
|- align="center" bgcolor="#ccffcc"
| 57
| February 24, 1986
| Dallas
| W 110–105
|
|
|
| The Summit
| 37–20
|- align="center" bgcolor="#ffcccc"
| 58
| February 25, 1986
| @ Utah
| L 97–100
|
|
|
| Salt Palace Acord Arena
| 37–21
|- align="center" bgcolor="#ccffcc"
| 59
| February 27, 1986
| Denver
| W 117–111
|
|
|
| The Summit
| 38–21

|- align="center" bgcolor="#ffcccc"
| 60
| March 1, 1986
| @ Portland
| L 112–117
|
|
|
| Memorial Coliseum
| 38–22
|- align="center" bgcolor="#ffcccc"
| 61
| March 3, 1986
| @ Seattle
| L 105–118
|
|
|
| Seattle Center Coliseum
| 38–23
|- align="center" bgcolor="#ffcccc"
| 62
| March 4, 1986
| @ Denver
| L 115–128
|
|
|
| McNichols Sports Arena
| 38–24
|- align="center" bgcolor="#ccffcc"
| 63
| March 6, 1986
| Sacramento
| W 116–105
|
|
|
| The Summit
| 39–24
|- align="center" bgcolor="#ccffcc"
| 64
| March 8, 1986
| San Antonio
| W 126–117
|
|
|
| The Summit
| 40–24
|- align="center" bgcolor="#ffcccc"
| 65
| March 11, 1986
| Boston
| L 104–116
|
|
|
| The Summit
| 40–25
|- align="center" bgcolor="#ccffcc"
| 66
| March 13, 1986
| Portland
| W 126–118
|
|
|
| The Summit
| 41–25
|- align="center" bgcolor="#ccffcc"
| 67
| March 15, 1986
| L.A. Clippers
| W 148–116
|
|
|
| The Summit
| 42–25
|- align="center" bgcolor="#ffcccc"
| 68
| March 16, 1986
| @ L.A. Lakers
| L 111–116
|
|
|
| The Forum
| 42–26
|- align="center" bgcolor="#ccffcc"
| 69
| March 18, 1986
| Phoenix
| W 112–109
|
|
|
| The Summit
| 43–26
|- align="center" bgcolor="#ffcccc"
| 70
| March 20, 1986
| @ Milwaukee
| L 106–116
|
|
|
| MECCA Arena
| 43–27
|- align="center" bgcolor="#ccffcc"
| 71
| March 22, 1986
| @ New York
| W 114–99
|
|
|
| Madison Square Garden
| 44–27
|- align="center" bgcolor="#ffcccc"
| 72
| March 24, 1986
| @ Boston
| L 107–114
|
|
|
| Boston Garden
| 44–28
|- align="center" bgcolor="#ccffcc"
| 73
| March 26, 1986
| @ Indiana
| W 110–101
|
|
|
| Market Square Arena
| 45–28
|- align="center" bgcolor="#ffcccc"
| 74
| March 28, 1986
| @ Detroit
| L 107–116
|
|
|
| Pontiac Silverdome
| 45–29
|- align="center" bgcolor="#ccffcc"
| 75
| March 29, 1986
| @ Washington
| W 114–109
|
|
|
| Capital Centre
| 46–29

|- align="center" bgcolor="#ccffcc"
| 76
| April 1, 1986
| Golden State
| W 125–121
|
|
|
| The Summit
| 47–29
|- align="center" bgcolor="#ccffcc"
| 77
| April 3, 1986
| @ San Antonio
| W 136–110
|
|
|
| HemisFair Arena
| 48–29
|- align="center" bgcolor="#ccffcc"
| 78
| April 4, 1986
| @ Phoenix
| W 112–89
|
|
|
| Arizona Veterans Memorial Coliseum
| 49–29
|- align="center" bgcolor="#ccffcc"
| 79
| April 6, 1986
| L.A. Lakers
| W 109–103
|
|
|
| The Summit
| 50–29
|- align="center" bgcolor="#ccffcc"
| 80
| April 8, 1986
| Seattle
| W 109–95
|
|
|
| The Summit
| 51–29
|- align="center" bgcolor="#ffcccc"
| 81
| April 10, 1986
| @ L.A. Lakers
| L 113–117
|
|
|
| The Forum
| 51–30
|- align="center" bgcolor="#ffcccc"
| 82
| April 12, 1986
| Phoenix
| L 92–110
|
|
|
| The Summit
| 51–31

Playoffs

|- align="center" bgcolor="#ccffcc"
| 1
| April 17, 1986
| Sacramento
| W 107–87
| Akeem Olajuwon (29)
| Akeem Olajuwon (15)
| Rodney McCray (7)
| The Summit15,101
| 1–0
|- align="center" bgcolor="#ccffcc"
| 2
| April 19, 1986
| Sacramento
| W 111–103
| Robert Reid (29)
| Ralph Sampson (8)
| Reid, Sampson (6)
| The Summit16,016
| 2–0
|- align="center" bgcolor="#ccffcc"
| 3
| April 22, 1986
| @ Sacramento
| W 113–98
| Lloyd, Sampson (25)
| Akeem Olajuwon (13)
| Lloyd, McCray (7)
| ARCO Arena I10,333
| 3–0
|-

|- align="center" bgcolor="#ccffcc"
| 1
| April 26, 1986
| Denver
| W 126–119
| Akeem Olajuwon (38)
| Akeem Olajuwon (16)
| Robert Reid (9)
| The Summit15,448
| 1–0
|- align="center" bgcolor="#ccffcc"
| 2
| April 29, 1986
| Denver
| W 119–101
| Ralph Sampson (27)
| Akeem Olajuwon (14)
| Rodney McCray (10)
| The Summit16,016
| 2–0
|- align="center" bgcolor="#ffcccc"
| 3
| May 2, 1986
| @ Denver
| L 115–116
| Akeem Olajuwon (31)
| Akeem Olajuwon (11)
| McCray, Lloyd (8)
| McNichols Sports Arena17,022
| 2–1
|- align="center" bgcolor="#ffcccc"
| 4
| May 4, 1986
| @ Denver
| L 111–114 (OT)
| Ralph Sampson (28)
| Ralph Sampson (13)
| Robert Reid (7)
| McNichols Sports Arena14,152
| 2–2
|- align="center" bgcolor="#ccffcc"
| 5
| May 6, 1986
| Denver
| W 131–103
| Akeem Olajuwon (36)
| Akeem Olajuwon (19)
| Robert Reid (12)
| The Summit16,016
| 3–2
|- align="center" bgcolor="#ccffcc"
| 6
| May 8, 1986
| @ Denver
| W 126–122 (2OT)
| Akeem Olajuwon (28)
| Ralph Sampson (18)
| Rodney McCray (7)
| McNichols Sports Arena17,022
| 4–2
|-

|- align="center" bgcolor="#ffcccc"
| 1
| May 10, 1986
| @ L.A. Lakers
| L 107–119
| Akeem Olajuwon (28)
| Akeem Olajuwon (16)
| Robert Reid (8)
| The Forum17,505
| 0–1
|- align="center" bgcolor="#ccffcc"
| 2
| May 13, 1986
| @ L.A. Lakers
| W 112–102
| Sampson, Lloyd (24)
| Ralph Sampson (16)
| Rodney McCray (11)
| The Forum17,505
| 1–1
|- align="center" bgcolor="#ccffcc"
| 3
| May 16, 1986
| L.A. Lakers
| W 117–109
| Akeem Olajuwon (40)
| Akeem Olajuwon (12)
| Robert Reid (12)
| The Summit16,016
| 2–1
|- align="center" bgcolor="#ccffcc"
| 4
| May 18, 1986
| L.A. Lakers
| W 105–95
| Akeem Olajuwon (35)
| Jim Petersen (13)
| Rodney McCray (6)
| The Summit16,016
| 3–1
|- align="center" bgcolor="#ccffcc"
| 5
| May 21, 1986
| @ L.A. Lakers
| W 114–112
| Akeem Olajuwon (30)
| Akeem Olajuwon (7)
| Rodney McCray (11)
| The Forum17,505
| 4–1
|-

|- align="center" bgcolor="#ffcccc"
| 1
| May 26, 1986
| @ Boston
| L 100–112
| Akeem Olajuwon (33)
| Akeem Olajuwon (12)
| Robert Reid (8)
| Boston Garden14,890
| 0–1
|- align="center" bgcolor="#ffcccc"
| 2
| May 29, 1986
| @ Boston
| L 95–117
| Akeem Olajuwon (21)
| Akeem Olajuwon (10)
| McCray, Reid (5)
| Boston Garden14,890
| 0–2
|- align="center" bgcolor="#ccffcc"
| 3
| June 1, 1986
| Boston
| W 106–104
| Ralph Sampson (24)
| Ralph Sampson (22)
| Robert Reid (9)
| The Summit16,016
| 1–2
|- align="center" bgcolor="#ffcccc"
| 4
| June 3, 1986
| Boston
| L 103–106
| Ralph Sampson (25)
| Akeem Olajuwon (14)
| Ralph Sampson (9)
| The Summit16,016
| 1–3
|- align="center" bgcolor="#ccffcc"
| 5
| June 5, 1986
| Boston
| W 111–96
| Akeem Olajuwon (32)
| Akeem Olajuwon (14)
| Robert Reid (17)
| The Summit16,016
| 2–3
|- align="center" bgcolor="#ffcccc"
| 6
| June 8, 1986
| @ Boston
| L 97–114
| Akeem Olajuwon (21)
| Akeem Olajuwon (10)
| McCray, Reid (5)
| Boston Garden14,890
| 2–4
|-

Player statistics

Season

Playoffs

Awards and records

Awards
Akeem Olajuwon, All-NBA Second Team

Records

Transactions

Trades

Free agents

Additions

Subtractions

See also
1985–86 NBA season

References

Houston Rockets seasons
Western Conference (NBA) championship seasons
Hou